Semir Hadžibulić (born 16 August 1986) is a Serbian-born Bosniak former football player.

Career
His career started in his home town club FK Novi Pazar. He moved in 2005 to the historical Belgrade club FK BASK. His major achievement was to sign for the Serbian SuperLiga club FK Napredak Kruševac in 2007. In January 2008, he moved to Macedonian First Football League club KF Shkëndija. After six months there, in summer 2008, he moved to Albanian Superliga club FK Apolonia Fier. In July 2010 he signed for KF Besa Kavajë in Albanian Superliga for a fee of €136,000. Early in 2011 he signed to FC Dinamo Tbilisi in Georgian Umaglesi Liga. In summer 2011 he moved back to FK Novi Pazar and played in Serbian SuperLiga. In January 2016 he signed for KI Klaksvik.

After two years in the Faroe Islands, Hadžibulić joined SC Gjilani in the Football Superleague of Kosovo on 8 January 2019. On 12 June 2019, KÍ Klaksvík announced that Hadžibulić had returned to the club.

Honours
Besa Kavajë
Albanian Supercup: 2010

KI Klaksvik
Faroe Islands Premier League: 2019
Faroe Islands Cup: 2016

References

External links
 
 Profile at Srbijafudbal

1986 births
Living people
Sportspeople from Novi Pazar
Bosniaks of Serbia
Serbian footballers
Association football midfielders
Serbian expatriate footballers
FK Novi Pazar players
FK BASK players
FK Napredak Kruševac players
Besa Kavajë players
KF Shkëndija players
FK Mladost Velika Obarska players
KF Vllaznia Shkodër players
KF Apolonia Fier players
Doxa Katokopias FC players
FC Dinamo Tbilisi players
KÍ Klaksvík players
FK Čelik Nikšić players
KS Gramozi Ersekë players
SC Gjilani players
Faroe Islands Premier League players
Football Superleague of Kosovo players
Cypriot First Division players
Kategoria Superiore players
Premier League of Bosnia and Herzegovina players
Montenegrin First League players
Serbian SuperLiga players
Serbian First League players
Erovnuli Liga players
Serbian expatriate sportspeople in Albania
Serbian expatriate sportspeople in North Macedonia
Serbian expatriate sportspeople in Cyprus
Serbian expatriate sportspeople in Georgia (country)
Serbian expatriate sportspeople in Montenegro
Serbian expatriate sportspeople in Kuwait
Serbian expatriate sportspeople in Bosnia and Herzegovina
Serbian expatriate sportspeople in the Faroe Islands
Expatriate footballers in Albania
Expatriate footballers in North Macedonia
Expatriate footballers in Cyprus
Expatriate footballers in Georgia (country)
Expatriate footballers in Montenegro
Expatriate footballers in Kuwait
Expatriate footballers in Bosnia and Herzegovina
Expatriate footballers in the Faroe Islands
Expatriate footballers in Kosovo
Al Tadhamon SC players
Kuwait Premier League players